Martins Licis (born September 28, 1990) is a Latvian-American professional strongman, notable for winning 2019 World's Strongest Man, 2022 Arnold Strongman Classic, and 2021 Rogue Invitational strongman championships. He's one of only four strongmen in history (after Žydrūnas Savickas, Brian Shaw and Hafþór Júlíus Björnsson) to win both World's Strongest Man and Arnold Strongman Classic competitions.

Early life
Licis was born in Riga on September 28, 1990. He holds dual citizenship with Latvia and the United States, and speaks Latvian fluently. He represents the United States in competition, having moved there with his family at the age of four. He grew up in Amherst, Massachusetts. During summers, he visited his grandparents' farm in Latvia, where he was first introduced to stone lifting by his grandfather Imants Līcis, a sculptor who formerly competed in Olympic weightlifting.

In 2010, Licis moved to California together with his friend Mikel Monleon. Licis eventually found a job as a personal trainer in West Hollywood, and later found out about the Odd Haugen All-American Strength Classic. Through this, Haugen invited Licis to train at his gym, but only let him compete in the Strength Classic three years later in 2015.

Career
In 2015, Licis placed first in the Odd Haugen All-American Strength Classic. In 2016, Licis reached the World's Strongest Man finals for the first time and placed sixth. He placed fourth in the World’s Strongest Man finals in 2017 and 2018. Besides Strongman, Licis also competes in mas-wrestling, a variation of stick wrestling. He won gold in the 2016 MAS Wrestling Open World Championships in Columbus Ohio, beating out previous champion VIktor Kolibabchuk. Licis' first pro triumph came in 2017 at the Ultimate Strongman Summermania, winning the competition representing his home country Latvia.

In 2019, Licis came in second during the Arnold Strongman Classic, placing behind current and 3x champion Hafþór Júlíus Björnsson. In June later that year, however, he won his first World’s Strongest Man title, beating out defending champion Björnsson, who finished in third after suffering a torn plantar fascia in his left foot during the heats that significantly hampered him in the final. Licis also placed ahead of Mateusz Kieliszkowski who placed second, and 4 times World's Strongest Man winner Brian Shaw who placed sixth, still recovering his hamstring injury sustained in the Arnold Strongman Classic earlier in March of the same year. Licis dominated the final, finishing in the top three in all five disciplines, and winning two events outright.

On January 18, 2020, Licis won the Arnold Strongman Santa Monica Qualifier, beating out Brian Shaw by 1 point. This earned him a spot to compete in the Arnold Strongman Classic in Columbus, Ohio on March 8. At the Arnold Strongman Classic, Licis finished 3rd, behind the winner Björnsson and the second place Kieliszkowski.

Licis spent most of the 2020 and 2021 strongman season in recovery, with his ultimate comeback taking place in late October to the very first Rogue Invitational Strongman competition, which boasted the biggest prize purse in the history of strongman competition with four WSM champions competing. Licis beat Tom Stoltman and Oleksii Novikov to win the competition and a top prize of $133,685. The next day he set a new record in Thor's Hammer Lift by lifting a 136-kilogram (300-pound) hammer.

In March 2022, at the 2022 Arnold Strongman Classic, Licis performed consistently well in all five events, with first, second, or third finishes in all but one event. His win in the last event Stone-to-Shoulder for Reps secured him the title of the Arnold Strongman Classic for the first time, after finishing runner-up and third place in 2019 and 2020.

In May 2022, Licis returned to World's Strongest Man for the first time since winning the 2019 contest. He finished 2nd, behind the winner Stoltman and beating Novikov on a tie breaker.

Media appearances

In May 2020, Licis appeared on Game On! as an obstacle, engaging contestants in a strength contest.

In August 2020, Licis appeared on an episode of To Tell The Truth with two other people all of them claiming to be the reigning World’s Strongest Man.

In March 2021, Licis appeared in a Geico commercial titled "Worlds Strongest Man Takes On The Recycling".

Personal records

Strongman
 Deadlift –  [has achieved this feat twice] (2017 World's Strongest Man & 2019 Arnold Strongman Classic) 
 Barrel Deadlift –  x 7 reps in 47.00 seconds (2018 World's Strongest Man - Group 4)
 Deadlift Static Hold –  - 41.25 seconds (2019 World's Strongest Man)
 Silver Dollar Deadlift –  (2018 World's Ultimate Strongman)
 Squat –  (2022 Arnold Strongman Classic) 
 Circus Barbell Squat (for reps) –  x 9 reps (2019 World's Strongest Man)
 Circus Barbell Squat (for reps) –  x 13 reps (2017 World's Strongest Man)
 Steinborn Squat –  (2019 Arnold Strongman Classic) (World Record)
 Flintstone Barbell press –  (2022 World's Strongest Man) 
 Log press –  (2022 Arnold Strongman Classic)
 Axle press –  (2018 World's Strongest Man)
 Cyr Dumbbell press –  (2020 Arnold Strongman Classic)
 Giant Dumbbell press –  x 3 reps (2022 Arnold Strongman Classic)
 Bale Tote –  for 3.78 meters (2017 Arnold Strongman Classic)
 Timber carry –  (10 meter ramp) in 10.03 seconds (Raw grip) (2022 Arnold Strongman Classic)
 Hercules hold ( in each hand) – 50.94  seconds (2019 Giants Live Wembley)
 Atlas Stones – 5 Stones weighing  in 20.37 seconds (2019 Giants Live Wembley) 
 Atlas Stones – 5 Stones weighing  in 18.73 seconds (2018 Giants Live World Tour Finals) 
 Inver Stones – 5 Stones weighing  in 23.53 seconds (2021 Rogue Invitational) (World Record)
 Odd Haugen tombstone to shoulder -  x 2 reps (2019 Arnold Strongman Classic)
 Rogue-a-Coaster (arm over arm pull) -  over a 54 feet inclined ramp in 33.83 seconds (2022 Rogue Invitational) (World Record)
 Conan's Wheel of Pain –  36.35 meters (119 3/4 feet) (2019 Arnold Strongman Classic) (World Record)
 Truck pull –  25 meters in 37.84 seconds (2015 Giants Live Viking Challenge)

References

External links
Profile on Ultimate Strongman
YouTube channel
Instagram profile
Twitch Channel

Facebook page

1990 births
American sportsmen
American strength athletes
Living people
Latvian emigrants to the United States
Sportspeople from Amherst, Massachusetts
Twitch (service) streamers